HSwMS Clas Fleming was a mine cruiser of the Swedish Navy from World War I until the Cold War. She was named after the 17th century Swedish admiral Clas Fleming.

Commissioned in 1914, Clas Fleming was among the first Swedish warships to use Parsons steam turbines. As built it was armed with four  guns in a superfiring arrangement: one at the forecastle, one - highly unusually - on top of its armoured conning tower, one on the poop deck, and a fourth at the stern. Up to 190 naval mines could be carried on the main deck. In service the stern was found to be very wet on rough seas, so in 1918-19 the poop deck was extended to the stern; the guns at the stern and on the conning tower were accordingly moved to a more old-fashioned, side-by-side positions just aft of amidships. In 1926 three  anti-aircraft guns were added, one on the conning tower and two just behind the amidships 120mm guns.

Of the eight original coal-fired boilers only two were retained, and these were modified to oil firing.

After World War II Clas Fleming was placed in reserve in Stockholm, and was decommissioned on 1 January 1959.

Bibliography
 
 

Cruisers of the Swedish Navy
Ships built in Stockholm
1912 ships